Grand Council may refer to:

 Grand Council (Qing dynasty), an important policy-making body in the Qing Empire
 Great Council of Venice, legislative body that existed from 1172 to 1797
 Grand Conseil, two institutions during the Ancien Régime in France
 Grand Council (Switzerland), a unicameral legislative style adopted by a number of cantons in Switzerland
 Grand Council of Fascism, the main body of Mussolini's Fascist government in Italy
 Grand Council of the Crees, the political body that represents the approximately 14,000 Crees of the James Bay and Nunavik regions
 Grand Council (Mi'kmaq)
 Grand Council on the Auglaize River 1792, and again in 1793, by the Western Confederacy during the Northwest Indian War

See also
 Grand and General Council, the parliament of San Marino
 Grand Council, an indirectly-elected conciliar government proposed as part of both the Albany Plan and the Galloway Plan for union between the Thirteen Colonies